Jason Moran may refer to:

 Jason Moran (criminal) (1967–2003), Australian mobster
 Jason Moran (musician) (born 1975), American jazz pianist